Davoud Rashidi (July 16, 1933 – August 26, 2016) was an Iranian actor. Rashidi, Ali Nasirian, Ezatollah Entezami, Jamshid Mashayekhi and Mohammad Ali Keshavarz are known as "the five most important actors in the history of Iranian cinema" because of their influence. His daughter, Leili Rashidi, is also an actress.

Career
His first film was Escape from the Trap (1971, Jalal Moghadam) after years of stage acting. He has also had a career in television series.

Selected filmography
Fleeing the Trap (1971) - directed by Jalal Moghadam
The Beehive (1975) - directed by Fereydun Gole
 Hezar Dastan, 1978-1987, TV series
 Mr. Hieroglyph, 1980
 The Border, 1981
 The Liberation
 The Prize, 1982
 The Spider's House, 1983
 Kamalolmolk, 1984
 The Inner Devil, 1984
 Through the Trap, 1993
 Loneliest Leader, 1997
 Leaning on the Wind, 2000
 Reign of Love (TV series), 2000
 Mokhtarnameh, 2012
 Ekbatan, 2012

See also
 Ibn al-Sheikh, grandfather of Davoud Rashidi

References

External links

 

1933 births
2016 deaths
20th-century Iranian male actors
Iranian male stage actors
Male actors from Tehran
Iranian male television actors
Recipients of the Order of Culture and Art
People from Babol
Iranian Science and Culture Hall of Fame recipients in Cinema